Angela Elise McArdle (born June 7, 1983) is an American politician from Texas and California who was elected on May 28, 2022 as the 22nd and current chair of the Libertarian National Committee. She was also the Secretary of the Libertarian Party of California from April 2018 to April 2019, and was a board member of the Mises Caucus.

Early life and education 
Angela has worked as a paralegal and legal aide for over eleven years.  Angela currently works in litigation and also has a private practice where she provides self help legal services to low income clients. The bulk of Angela’s practices focuses on real estate and constitutional law.

Angela received her Bachelor’s Degree in Organizational Leadership from Biola University in 2009 and a Paralegal Certificate from UCLA Extension in 2013.  Angela is also trained as a craniosacral therapist through the Upledger Institute.

Career 
McArdle was the Libertarian nominee in the 2017 California's 34th congressional district special election. She finished the primary in 17th place out of a field of 22 candidates with 0.8%. McArdle ran again for the seat in 2018, and finished in 3rd place in a field of 3 candidates with 8.4%. 

In 2021 and 2022, McArdle was a candidate for Chair of the Libertarian National Committee. She was endorsed by the Mises Caucus, of which she was also a board member. She was elected to the position at the 2022 Libertarian National Convention on May 28.

At Porcfest 2021, an annual libertarian festival held in New Hampshire,  Executive Director of the Free State Project, Jeremy Kauffman and McArdle debated which strategy is more effective, the libertarian party strategy or the free state movement strategy. Kauffman argued that, "There are more people in this room that are elected members to the NH House of Representatives and former members of the Libertarian Party than there are Libertarian Party members nationwide." Meanwhile, Angela McArdle argued that while she wants to see the Free State Project succeed, she argues that the Free State Project could not have existed without the political infrastructure provided by the LP developed over the course of five decades.

On 3 December 2022, McArdle became the first known National Chair in the United States who has given a birth during her tenure.

Electoral history

References 

Living people
Libertarian National Committee chairs
21st-century American politicians
21st-century American women politicians
California Libertarians
1983 births
Candidates in the 2017 United States elections
Candidates in the 2018 United States elections
Women in California politics
Paleolibertarianism
Texas Libertarians